Benjamin Frederick Warburton (1864–22 September 1943), known as Ben Warburton, was an English footballer who played in The Football League for Notts County.

Early career
Ben Warburton was once described as "A sterling half-back". As a young man he played cricket for Notts Castle Cricket Club.

1888–1889 season

Playing at centre–half, Warburton made his Club & League debut on 8 September 1888 at Anfield, the then home of Everton. Notts County lost to the home team 2–1. Ben Warburton appeared in two of the 22 League matches played by Notts County in season 1888–89.

1889 onwards

In 1889 Warburton took a posting in South Africa and emigrated there to work in the telegraph service. He must have returned to Nottingham as births, marriages and deaths records his passing away at the age of 79 in Basford, a suburb of Nottingham, on 22 September 1943.

References

1864 births
1943 deaths
English footballers
Notts County F.C. players
English Football League players
Association football midfielders